Hendrikus A. Plenter (1913–1997) was a Dutch football defender who was a member of the Netherlands' squad at the 1938 FIFA World Cup. However, he never made an appearance for the national team. He also played for Be Quick 1887.

References

External links
 FIFA profile

1913 births
1997 deaths
Dutch footballers
Association football defenders
1938 FIFA World Cup players
Footballers from Groningen (city)
Be Quick 1887 players